Julia Lebedeva (born 26 February 1978) is a former competitive figure skater who represented Russia and Armenia. Lebedeva competed for Russia until 1999, when she switched to competing for Armenia. For Armenia, she competed three times at the European Figure Skating Championships and placed 27th at the 2002 Winter Olympics.

Programs

Competitive highlights

References

External links
 

Russian female single skaters
Olympic figure skaters of Armenia
Figure skaters at the 2002 Winter Olympics
1978 births
Figure skaters from Moscow
Living people